In 1975 the United States Supreme Court in the case of NLRB v. J. Weingarten, Inc.   upheld a National Labor Relations Board (NLRB) decision that employees have a right to union representation at investigatory interviews. These rights have become known as the Weingarten Rights.

During an investigatory interview, the Supreme Court ruled that the following rules apply:

 Rule 1 The employee must make a clear request for union representation before or during the interview. The employee cannot be punished for making this request.
 Rule 2 After the employee makes the request, the employer must choose from among three options:
 Grant the request and delay questioning until the union representative arrives and (prior to the interview continuing) the representative has a chance to consult privately with the employee; 
 Deny the request and end the interview immediately; or
 Give the employee a clear choice between having the interview without representation, or ending the interview.
 Rule 3 If the employer denies the request for union representation, and continues to ask questions, it commits an unfair labor practice and the employee has a right to refuse to answer. The employer may not discipline the employee for such a refusal.

In July 2000, the NLRB under the Clinton administration extended the Weingarten Rights to employees at nonunionized workplaces. On June 15, 2004, the NLRB under the George W. Bush administration effectively reversed the previous ruling by a three to two vote.

External links 

 Full text of NLRB V. Weingarten, Inc., 420 U.S. 251 (1975) 

National Labor Relations Board
1975 in United States case law